Dillington House is a residential adult education college near Ilminster in the parish of Whitelackington, Somerset, England. The present house, which dates from the 16th century, is owned by Lord Cameron of Dillington and operated by Somerset County Council. There has been a house on the site since before the Norman Conquest, probably taking advantage of the nearby chalybeate spring.

History

The house has 16th-century origins, but was reshaped around 1838 by its then owner John.E.Lee to the design of Sir James Pennethorne. John Lee, who purchased the house, had been born John Hanning and had assumed the surname Lee on becoming the heir of his uncle Major Edward Lee (d.1819) of Orleigh Court, Buckland Brewer, North Devon. John Lee's brother-in-law and his tenant at Orleigh Court was William Speke of Jordans near Ilminster, father of the celebrated discoverer of the River Nile John Hanning Speke. It is now a Grade II* listed building. Dillington House was the country residence of George III's Prime Minister, Lord North who acquired it through marriage to Anne Speke. The stables which were built in the 18th or early 19th century were remodelled in 1875 by George Nattress and later in the 1960s when the Coach House was converted into a theatre. The two lodges adjacent to the main gate are also Grade II* listed and are in private ownership.

In 1940, the 'Fortress Ilminster' project saw the area prepare for what was thought to be imminent invasion by the Nazis. The drive extending from the town, north toward Dillington House hosted tank barricades and concrete gun emplacements as part of the Taunton Stop Line. Remains of Fortress Ilminster can still be seen today and the drive is now a public footpath.

In the spring of 2009 a new building, 'The Hyde', was opened, providing two studio spaces, additional dining accommodation and 15 fully accessible bedrooms.  Designed by Tim Rolt and Dan Talkes of Purcell Miller Tritton, the building won the 2010 South-West Region Architecture Award from the Royal Institute of British Architects.

Present use 
Dillington House offers a range of day courses and residential short courses as well as a programme of public lectures. As well as being a hotel, it is also a venue for conferences and meetings, weddings and other private events. The residential accommodation is set in historic parkland and gardens.

In 2017, the House and Gardens were used as the location for a short documentary film, highlighting the national decrease in the numbers of Pembroke Welsh Corgis.

References

External links

 Dillington House homepage

Further education colleges in Somerset
Grade II* listed buildings in South Somerset
Grade II listed buildings in South Somerset
Prime ministerial homes in the United Kingdom
Grade II* listed houses in Somerset
Adult education in the United Kingdom